Frog City, Rhode Island is a village (not a city) in Johnston, Rhode Island within another village of Thornton, Rhode Island and according to one source was "probably termed Frog City because of the numerous frogs along the Pocasset River and ponds near Victoria Mill at Mill Street and Victoria Mount."  Frog City was bordered by Mill St. to the North, Plainfield St. to the East and South, and Rachela St. to the West. 

The British Hosiery Mill, later known as the Priscilla Worsted Mill was built in Frog City in 1884, and the Victoria Mill on John Street was the largest of the mills in the area.

References 

Villages in Providence County, Rhode Island